Nguyễn Minh Phụng (born 22 January 1991) is a Vietnamese karateka. He won the silver medal in the men's kumite +84 kg event at the 2018 Asian Games held in Jakarta, Indonesia. In the final, he lost against Sajjad Ganjzadeh of Iran.

In 2017, he won the gold medal in the men's +75kg event and the men's team kumite event at the Southeast Asian Games held in Kuala Lumpur, Malaysia.

Achievements

References 

Living people
1991 births
Place of birth missing (living people)
Vietnamese male karateka
Karateka at the 2018 Asian Games
Medalists at the 2018 Asian Games
Asian Games medalists in karate
Asian Games silver medalists for Vietnam
Southeast Asian Games gold medalists for Vietnam
Southeast Asian Games medalists in karate
Competitors at the 2017 Southeast Asian Games
21st-century Vietnamese people